Andrew Bowie may refer to:

 Andrew Bowie (philosopher) (born 1952), British professor of philosophy and German
 Andrew Bowie (politician) (born 1987), Scottish Conservative politician